The J. J. Ugland Companies is a group of shipping companies based in Grimstad, Norway.

History
The company was first established as Uglands Rederi in 1930 by ship owner Johan Milmar Ugland  (1881-1960). His sons Johan Jørgen Ugland (1921-2010) and Andreas Kjell Lund Ugland  (1925-2019) subsequently assumed  control of the company.

The group  operates a fleet of supramax dry cargo vessels, handysize bulk carriers,  shuttle tankers,  barges,  heavy weight crane vessels and  tug boats. The company also owns the EPC facility, A.S Nymo. Shipping is performed by the subsidiaries A/S Uglands Rederi and Ugland Shipping AS, while bulk shipping is performed by Ugland Bulk Transport A/S. Operation of the barges is performed by the Stavanger-based Ugland Construction AS. Technical management is performed by Ugland Marine Services AS.

References

Shipping companies of Norway
Dry bulk shipping companies
Tanker shipping companies
Transport companies established in 1930
Companies based in Agder
Companies formerly listed on the Oslo Stock Exchange
Norwegian companies established in 1930